A heavily modified Gloster Meteor F8 fighter, the "prone position/prone pilot" Meteor, was used by the Royal Air Force in 1954 and 1955 to evaluate the effects of acceleration/inertia-induced forces while flying in a prone position. Along with the Reid and Sigrist R.S.4 "Bobsleigh", the Gloster Meteor was engaged in a proof-of-concept experimental programme that proved in practice that the difficulties in rearward visibility and ejection outweighed the advantages of sustaining higher g effects.

Design and development
In the early 1950s the adoption of a prone position cockpit in future combat aircraft designs appeared attractive for two reasons. Firstly, such a configuration enabled the frontal area of the airframe to be reduced and therefore reduced drag. Secondly, aircrew can withstand greater inertial forces if not sitting upright, a vital consideration given the need for jet combat aircraft to manoeuvre at ever increasing speeds. While the Reid and Sigrist R.S.4 "Bobsleigh" explored low speed performance 1951–1956, the Royal Air Force soon also needed a higher performance concept aircraft.

The Bristol Aeroplane Company sought to exploit these advantages by incorporating a prone pilot position in its proposal for a rocket-powered fighter, the Bristol Type 185. In order to establish the viability of a prone pilot cockpit, the RAF Institute of Aviation Medicine required a jet aircraft that could be flown in experimental flight tests. The last production Meteor F8, serial WK935, built by Armstrong-Whitworth was selected for modification and joined the Institute in autumn 1954.

Armstrong-Whitworth carried out the modifications as an "in-house" project. The standard fighter cockpit was retained; WK935 was never flown solo from the radically modified front cockpit, which incorporated a custom-built couch, offset tiny control column, and suspended rear pedals. A Meteor NF 12 tail unit was substituted for the usual F8 tail. The Armstrong-Whitworth Chief Test Pilot Eric George Franklin carried out the test flights.

The prone pilot's emergency escape involved a complex procedure which included jettisoning the rudder pedals, crawling backward to an escape hatch and retracting the nose wheel. This system was never used.

Operational history

Testing and evaluation

Following some 55 hours of flight testing over 99 flights, the results were inconclusive; although the prone position concept was feasible, the development of special aviation clothing (g-suits) offered a simpler solution to the problem of counteracting inertial forces, and the prone position Meteor was no longer needed.  Although prone pilots were able to control the aircraft as well as a standard Meteor, the extreme forward position with limited rear view presented a problem in mock combat with conventional aircraft. RAF test pilot C.M. Lambert described flying Meteor WK935 in the 30 March 1956 issue of Flight magazine.

Meteor F8 WK935 was retired after a year and after storage at No. 12 Maintenance Unit, the aircraft was sent to RAF Colerne before being preserved at the Royal Air Force Museum Cosford.

Operators

 Royal Air Force

Specifications (Meteor F.8 modified)

See also

References
Notes

Bibliography

 Ashley, Glenn. Meteor in Action. Carrollton, Texas: Squadron/Signal Publications Inc., 1995. .
 Bowyer, Chaz. Gloster Meteor. London: Ian Allan Ltd., 1985. .
 Butler, Tony. Gloster Meteor. Milton Keynes, Buckinghamshire, United Kingdom: Hall Park Books Ltd., 2001. .
 Caruana, Richard J. and Richard A. Franks. The Gloster & AW Meteor. Kingsway, Bedford, United Kingdom: SAM Publications, 2004. .
 Lambert, C.M. Handling the Prone-pilot Meteor: Flying a Jet Aircraft Head First. Flight, 30 March 1956 
 Green, William and Gordon Swanborough. The Great Book of Fighters. St. Paul, Minnesota: MBI Publishing, 2001. .
 Jones, Barry. Gloster Meteor. Ramsbury, Marlborough, Wiltshire, United Kingdom: The Crowood Press Ltd., 1998. .
 Young, Michael G. "Prone Meteor." Aviation News, Vol. 13, No. 22, 22 March–4 April 1985.

External links

 Gloster Meteor T7/F8
 Royal Air Force Museum: Gloster Meteor F8 Prone Position

1950s British experimental aircraft
Aircraft first flown in 1954
Meteor F8
Prone pilot aircraft